Lunenburg County is a county located in the Commonwealth of Virginia. As of the 2020 census, the population was 11,936. Its county seat is Lunenburg.

History
Lunenburg County was established on May 1, 1746, from Brunswick County. The county is named for the former Duchy of Brunswick-Lünenburg in Germany, because one of the titles also carried by Britain's Hanoverian kings was Duke of Brunswick-Lünenburg.  Bedford, Charlotte, Halifax, and Mecklenburg Counties were later formed from Lunenburg County.  It is nicknamed "The Old Free State" because during the buildup of the Civil War, it let Virginia know the county would break off if the state did not join The Confederacy.

Among the earliest settlers of the county was William Taylor, born in King William County, Virginia. He was the son of Rev. Daniel Taylor, a Virginia native and Anglican priest educated at Trinity College, Cambridge University in England, and his wife Alice (Littlepage) Taylor.  William Taylor married Martha Waller, a daughter of Benjamin Waller of Williamsburg, Virginia.

In 1760 Taylor purchased three adjoining tracts of land in Lunenburg County totaling . Taylor soon became one of the county's leading citizens, representing Lunenburg in the Virginia House of Burgesses from 1765 until 1768. In that capacity, Taylor voted in 1765 to support statesman Patrick Henry's Virginia Resolves in 1765. Taylor served as County Clerk for 51 years (1763–1814).

Taylor was succeeded as County Clerk by his son William Henry Taylor, who held the office for another 32 years—from 1814 until 1846. Another son, General Waller Taylor, represented Lunenburg in the Virginia legislature, then moved to Vincennes, Indiana.  There he became a judge and subsequently Adjutant General of the United States Army under General William Henry Harrison in the War of 1812. General Waller Taylor later served as one of the first United States senators from the newly created state of Indiana from 1816 to 1825. He died on a visit home to see his relatives in Lunenburg County in 1826.

During much of the American Civil War, the family of Missionary Bishop Henry C. Lay lived in Lunenberg County, where Mrs. Lay (the former Eliza Withers Atkinson) grew up. Both of Bishop Lay's brothers served as Confederate colonels, and Mrs. Lay's uncle, Thomas Atkinson was bishop of North Carolina.

Cases surrounding an 1895 Lunenburg County murder are the subject of historian Suzanne Lebsock's book, A Murder in Virginia: Southern Justice on Trial.

Geography
According to the U.S. Census Bureau, the county has a total area of 432 square miles (1,120 km2), of which 432 square miles (1,118 km2) is land and 1 square mile (2 km2) (0.16%) is water.

Adjacent counties
Brunswick County (east)
Charlotte County (west)
Mecklenburg County (south)
Nottoway County (northeast)
Prince Edward County (north)

Major Highways
 (Eastbound Only – Three-Sixty Hwy)
 (Lunenburg County Rd; joins SR 49 and becomes Courthouse Rd; Court St and Main St in Victoria; K-V Rd; Main St and S Broad St in Kenbridge, Blackstone Rd)
 (Falls Rd; joins SR 40 in Victoria and becomes Main St; Courthouse Rd
 (E 5th Ave; S Hill Rd; Dundas Rd)
 (E 5th Ave; S Hill Rd)

Demographics

2020 census

Note: the US Census treats Hispanic/Latino as an ethnic category. This table excludes Latinos from the racial categories and assigns them to a separate category. Hispanics/Latinos can be of any race.

2000 Census
As of the census of 2000, there were 13,146 people, 4,998 households, and 3,383 families residing in the county. The population density was 30 people per square mile (12/km2). There were 5,736 housing units at an average density of 13 per square mile (5/km2). The racial makeup of the county was 59.12% White, 38.58% Black or African American, 0.16% Native American, 0.21% Asian, 0.05% Pacific Islander, 0.75% from other races, and 1.14% from two or more races. 1.79% of the population were Hispanic or Latino of any race.

There were 4,998 households, out of which 27.30% had children under the age of 18 living with them, 49.50% were married couples living together, 13.30% had a female householder with no husband present, and 32.30% were non-families. 28.70% of all households were made up of individuals, and 14.70% had someone living alone who was 65 years of age or older. The average household size was 2.39 and the average family size was 2.91.

In the county, the population was spread out, with 21.30% under the age of 18, 8.00% from 18 to 24, 28.10% from 25 to 44, 25.80% from 45 to 64, and 16.80% who were 65 years of age or older. The median age was 40 years. For every 100 females there were 113.80 males. For every 100 females age 18 and over, there were 115.70 males.

The median income for a household in the county was $27,899, and the median income for a family was $34,302. Males had a median income of $26,496 versus $20,237 for females. The per capita income for the county was $14,951. About 14.90% of families and 20.00% of the population were below the poverty line, including 27.30% of those under age 18 and 22.80% of those age 65 or over.

Education
Lunenburg County Public Schools operates the following schools:
 Kenbridge Elementary School- Kenbridge, VA
 Victoria Elementary School- Victoria, VA
 Lunenburg Middle School- Victoria, VA
 Central High School- Victoria, VA

There are no private or independent schools in Lunenburg County, and no colleges or universities are located there. Kenston Forest School in Nottoway County, approximately 20 minutes away, offers the closest K-12 private education available to Lunenburg County residents.

Communities

Towns
Kenbridge
Victoria

Census-designated place
Lunenburg

Other unincorporated communities
Dundas
Fort Mitchell
Meherrin
Rehoboth

Notable people
Lewis Archer Boswell, experimented with flying aircraft.  Local legends claim he achieved heavier-than-air flight before the Wright Brothers, though there is no historical evidence.
Justice Paul Carrington (1733–1818), second member appointed of the Virginia Supreme Court.  
Roy Clark, born in Meherrin, he became a highly acclaimed country musician and a United Nations Goodwill Ambassador.
Henry W. Collier, born in the county, was elected fourteenth Governor of Alabama, from 1849 to 1853.
Alfred L. Cralle, born in the county, became an inventor and businessman in Pittsburgh, Pennsylvania. He is best remembered for inventing the lever-operated ice cream scoop in 1897.
Anthony Davis, an NFL football player, currently for the New Orleans Saints (beginning 2009).  From Lunenburg County, he attended Central High School in Victoria, Virginia.
Richard Ellis, born and raised in Lunenburg County, settled in Alabama where he was a member of Alabama's Constitutional Convention in 1818 and an associate justice of the Alabama Supreme Court (1819–1826).
James Greene Hardy, a county native, was elected Lt. Governor of the Commonwealth of Kentucky, serving from 1855 to 1856.
John A. Murrell (1806?–1844), born in the county, bandit, known for the Mystic Clan or Mystic Confederacy and Murrell Insurrection Conspiracy
Verner Moore White (1863–1923), born in the county, was a noted landscape and portrait artist.

Politics

See also
National Register of Historic Places listings in Lunenburg County, Virginia

References

 
Virginia counties
1746 establishments in Virginia
Populated places established in 1746